Barry Russell (New South Wales, Australia), was a  rugby league footballer in the New South Wales Rugby League competition.

Russell  played for Eastern Suburbs in the 1954 season and the North Sydney club in 1957.

Barry is the brother of Darcy Russell who also played for the Tricolours.

References
https://web.archive.org/web/20120906145203/http://www.yesterdayshero.com.au/PlayerProfile_Barry-Russell_7156.aspx
The Encyclopedia of Rugby League; Alan Whiticker & Glen Hudson

Living people
Australian rugby league players
North Sydney Bears players
Place of birth missing (living people)
Rugby league halfbacks
Sydney Roosters players
Year of birth missing (living people)